Fiona Allen (born 13 March 1965) is an English comedian and actress, most known for her work on Channel 4's Smack the Pony between 1999 and 2003.

Career
Allen has appeared in many sketch shows, including We Know Where You Live (Channel 5), Smack the Pony (Channel 4), Goodness Gracious Me and The All Star Comedy Show. She has also appeared in many television dramas including Dalziel and Pascoe and Coronation Street, as well as the sitcom Happiness alongside Paul Whitehouse. Subsequently, she appeared as Sandra, in the film version of the Viz comic strip The Fat Slags, and as a panelist on one episode of Mock the Week.

Allen appeared in the first episode of the second series of the E4 teenage drama Skins, playing Maxxie's mum Jackie Oliver. Jackie is married to Walter who is played by Bill Bailey. She also appears in BBC drama Waterloo Road as Georgia Stevenson, playing the former lover of Tom Clarkson. From 2019 to 2020, she portrayed Michaela Turnbull in the BBC soap opera EastEnders.

Personal life
Allen's grandfather was Harry Allen, one of the last British hangmen; her mother was born in Spain. Allen is married to the son of TV chat show host Michael Parkinson, also named Michael. Together they have three daughters, with one being named Felix.

In the late 1980s she worked as the box office manager at the Manchester nightclub the Haçienda, ran the Area (Factory Records' shop) at Affleck's Palace and makes a brief appearance playing herself in the film 24 Hour Party People.

In 2022, Allen returned to performing live Stand-up comedy at The Stand-Up Club, Piccadilly in London.

References

External links

1965 births
Living people
People from Bury, Greater Manchester
English people of Spanish descent
English soap opera actresses
English women comedians